Magnolia is a 1999 American epic psychological drama film written, directed and co-produced by Paul Thomas Anderson. It stars an ensemble cast, including Jeremy Blackman, Tom Cruise, Melinda Dillon, Philip Baker Hall, Philip Seymour Hoffman, Ricky Jay, William H. Macy, Alfred Molina, Julianne Moore, Michael Murphy, John C. Reilly, Jason Robards (in his final film role) and Melora Walters. The film has a mosaic of interrelated characters in search of happiness, forgiveness, and meaning in the San Fernando Valley. The script was inspired by the music of Aimee Mann, who contributed several songs to its soundtrack.

Magnolia received positive reviews, with critics praising its acting (particularly Cruise), direction, screenplay, and storytelling, as well as its soundtrack; however, some deemed it overlong and melodramatic. Of the ensemble cast, Cruise was nominated for Best Supporting Actor at the 72nd Academy Awards, and won the award in that category at the Golden Globes of 2000. The film also won the Golden Bear at the Berlin International Film Festival.

Plot
The film opens with three unrelated stories of deaths under synchronistic circumstances.

Officer Jim Kurring investigates a disturbance at a woman's apartment, finding a body in a closet. Dixon, a neighborhood boy, tries to tell him who committed the murder. Jim goes to the apartment of Claudia Wilson. Her neighbors called the police after she argued with her estranged father, Jimmy Gator, and blasted music while snorting cocaine. Unaware of her addiction, Jim asks her on a date.

Jimmy hosts a quiz show called What Do Kids Know? and is dying of cancer. The newest child prodigy on the show, Stanley Spector, is hounded by his father for the prize money and demeaned by the adults, who prevent him from using the bathroom during a commercial break. When the show resumes, he wets himself. As the show continues, a drunken Jimmy sickens, ordering the show to go on after he collapses. After Stanley's father berates him, Stanley runs away.

Donnie Smith, former What Do Kids Know? champion, watches the show from a bar. Donnie's parents took all his prize money. He has been fired from his job due to performance issues and is in love with a male bartender with braces. Donnie is obsessed with getting braces himself, thinking the bartender will love him back. He hatches a plan to steal money from his boss for the surgery.

The show's former producer, Earl Partridge, is also dying of cancer. Earl's trophy wife, Linda, collects his prescriptions while he is cared for by a nurse, Phil Parma. Earl asks Phil to find his estranged son, Frank Mackey, a motivational speaker and pickup artist. Frank is interviewed by a journalist who knows Frank took care of his dying mother after Earl left. Frank storms out of the interview, after which Phil tries to contact him.

Linda goes to see Earl's lawyer, hoping to change Earl's will. She married Earl for his money, but now loves him and does not want it. The lawyer suggests she renounce the will and decline the money, which would go to Frank. Linda rejects his advice and berates Phil for seeking out Frank, but later apologizes. She drives to a vacant parking lot and takes handfuls of medicine with alcohol. Dixon finds Linda near death in her car, robs her, and calls an ambulance.

Jim loses his gun while trying to catch a suspect. When he meets Claudia, they promise to be honest with each other, so he confesses his ineptitude as a cop and admits he has not been on a date since he divorced three years earlier. Claudia says he will hate her because of her problems, but Jim assures her that her past does not matter. They kiss, but she runs off.

Jimmy goes home to his wife, Rose, and confesses that he cheated on her. She asks why Claudia does not talk to him, and Jimmy admits that Claudia believes he molested her. Rose demands to know if it is true, but Jimmy cannot remember. Rose leaves him.

Donnie takes money from his employer's safe. As he drives away, he decides to return the money but cannot get back in. While climbing a utility pole to the roof, Jim sees him. Suddenly, frogs begin falling from the sky. Donnie is knocked from the pole, smashing his teeth. As Jimmy is about to shoot himself, frogs fall through his skylight, causing him to shoot the television and cause a house fire. Rose crashes her car outside of Claudia's apartment, but makes it inside and reconciles with her daughter. Earl is awakened and sees Frank beside him before dying. Linda's ambulance crashes in front of the hospital. Donnie is rescued by Jim, and Jim's gun falls from the sky. 

Jim helps Donnie return the money. Frank goes to the hospital to be with Linda, who will recover. Stanley wakes his father to tell him that he needs to be nice to him, but his father tells him to go to bed. Jim goes to see Claudia, telling her he wants to make things work between them. As Jim is explaining, Claudia smiles.

Cast

Production

Development
Anderson started to get ideas for Magnolia during the long editing period of Boogie Nights (1997).  As he got closer to finishing the film, he started writing down material for his new project. After the critical and financial success of Boogie Nights, New Line Cinema, who backed that film, told Anderson that he could do whatever he wanted and the filmmaker realized that, "I was in a position I will never ever be in again." Michael De Luca, then Head of Production at New Line, made the deal for Magnolia, granting Anderson final cut without hearing an idea for the film. Originally, Anderson had wanted to make a film that was "intimate and small-scale," something that he could shoot in 30 days. He had the title of "Magnolia" in his head before he wrote the script.

As he started writing, the script "kept blossoming" and he realized that there were many actors he wanted to write for and then decided to put "an epic spin on topics that don't necessarily get the epic treatment". He wanted to "make the epic, the all-time great San Fernando Valley movie". Anderson started with lists of images, words and ideas that "start resolving themselves into sequences and shots and dialogue," actors, and music. The first image he had for the film was the smiling face of actress Melora Walters. The next image that came to him was of Philip Baker Hall as her father. Anderson imagined Hall walking up the steps of Walters' apartment and having an intense confrontation with her. Anderson also did research on the magnolia tree  and discovered a concept that eating the tree's bark helped cure cancer.

Before Anderson became a filmmaker, one of the jobs he had was as an assistant for a television game show, Quiz Kid Challenge, an experience he incorporated into the script for Magnolia. He also claimed in interviews that the film is structured somewhat like "A Day in the Life" by The Beatles, and "it kind of builds up, note by note, then drops or recedes, then builds again".

Screenplay
By the time he started writing the script, Anderson was listening to the music of his friend Aimee Mann. He used her first two solo albums and demo tracks for her upcoming third album, Bachelor No. 2 or, the Last Remains of the Dodo, as a basis and inspiration; he said he "sat down to write an adaptation of Aimee Mann songs". In particular, Mann's song "Deathly" inspired the character of Claudia. Claudia uses part of the lyric as dialogue in the film ("Now that I've met you / Would you object to / Never seeing each other again"). The film also features a sequence in which the characters sing along to Mann's song "Wise Up".

The character of Jim Kurring originated in 1998 when actor John C. Reilly grew a mustache out of interest and started putting together an unintelligent cop character. He and Anderson did a few parodies of COPS with the director chasing Reilly around the streets with a video camera. Actress Jennifer Jason Leigh made an appearance in one of these videos. Some of Kurring's dialogue came from these sessions. This time around, Reilly wanted to do something different and told Anderson that he was "always cast as these heavies or these semi-retarded child men. Can't you give me something I can relate to, like falling in love with a girl?" Anderson also wanted to make Reilly a romantic lead because it was something different that the actor had not done before.

For Philip Seymour Hoffman, Anderson wanted him to play a "really simple, uncomplicated, caring character". The actor described his character as someone who "really takes pride in the fact that every day he's dealing with life and death circumstances". With Julianne Moore in mind, Anderson wrote a role for her to play a crazed character using many pharmaceuticals. According to the actress, "Linda doesn't know who she is or what she's feeling and can only try to explain it in the most vulgar terms possible". Anderson said that Linda's story was inspired by his own father's wife. For William H. Macy, Anderson felt that the actor was scared of big, emotional parts and wrote "a big tearful, emotional part" for him.

While convincing Philip Baker Hall to do the film by explaining the significance of the rain of frogs, the actor told him a story about when he was in the mountains of Italy and got caught in bad weather—a mix of rain, snow and tiny frogs. Hall had to pull off the road until the storm passed. According to an interview, Hall said that he based the character of Jimmy Gator on real-life TV personalities such as Bob Barker and Arthur Godfrey. The rain of frogs was inspired by the works of Charles Fort, and Anderson claims that he was unaware that it was also a reference in The Bible when he first wrote the sequence. At the time the filmmaker came across the notion of a rain of frogs, he was "going through a weird, personal time", and he started to understand "why people turn to religion in times of trouble, and maybe my form of finding religion was reading about rains of frogs and realizing that makes sense to me somehow".

Casting
Tom Cruise was a fan of Anderson's previous film, Boogie Nights, and contacted the filmmaker while he was working on Stanley Kubrick's Eyes Wide Shut (1999). Anderson met with Cruise on the set of Kubrick's film and the actor told him to keep him in mind for his next film. After Anderson finished the script, he sent Cruise a copy and the next day, the actor called him. Cruise was interested but nervous about the role. Anderson met with Cruise along with De Luca who helped convince the actor to do the film. Frank T.J. Mackey, the character that Cruise would play in the film, was based in part on an audio-recording done in an engineering class taught by a friend that was given to Anderson. It consisted of two men, "talking all this trash" about women and quoting a man named Ross Jeffries, who was teaching a new version of the Eric Weber course, "How to Pick Up Women," but utilizing hypnotism and subliminal language techniques. Anderson transcribed the tape and did a reading with Reilly and Chris Penn. The director then incorporated this dialogue and his research on Jeffries and other self-help gurus into Mackey and his sex seminar. Anderson felt that Cruise was drawn to the role because he had just finished making Eyes Wide Shut, playing a repressed character, and was able to then play a character that was "outlandish and bigger-than-life". Anderson filmed a full-length infomercial with Cruise and even bought time on late night TV to play it on.

Anderson wrote the role of Earl Partridge for Jason Robards, but Robards could not do it due to staph infection. After George C. Scott declined the role, Robards managed to take it. He said of his character, "It was sort of prophetic that I be asked to play a guy going out in life. It was just so right for me to do this and bring what I know to it". According to Hall, much of the material with Partridge was based on Anderson watching his father die of cancer. Anderson wanted Burt Reynolds to star in the film after working on Boogie Nights, but Reynolds declined it.

Filming
Filming began on January 12, 1999, and was initially scheduled to be 79 days, but ending up lasting until June 24, 1999, making a total of 90 filming days plus 10 days of second unit filming.

Anderson is known for his use of long takes in his films, moving along considerable distances with complex pivoting movements and transitions in actors and background.  Of the long takes in Magnolia, the most notable may be the 2 minutes 15 seconds where character Stanley Spector arrives at the studio for a taping of What Do Kids Know?, the camera seamlessly moving through multiple rooms and hallways, transitioning to follow different characters throughout the take.

The production designers looked at films with close, tight color palettes, films that were warm and analyzed why they did that and then applied it to Magnolia. They also wanted to evoke the colors of the magnolia flower: greens, browns and off-whites. For the section of the prologue that is set in 1911, Anderson used a hand-cranked Pathé camera that would have been used at the time. Some of the actors were nervous about singing the lyrics to Mann's "Wise Up" in the film's climactic scene and so Anderson had Moore do it first and she set the pace and everyone else followed.

Anderson and New Line reportedly had intense arguments about how to market Magnolia. He felt that the studio did not do a decent enough job on Boogie Nights and did not like the studio's poster or trailer for Magnolia. Anderson ended up designing his own poster, cut together a trailer himself, wrote the liner notes for the soundtrack album, and pushed to avoid hyping Cruise's presence in the film in favor of the ensemble cast. Even though Anderson ultimately got his way, he realized that he had to "learn to fight without being a jerk. I was a bit of a baby. At the first moment of conflict, I behaved in a slightly adolescent knee-jerk way. I just screamed."

Music and soundtracks

Anderson met Aimee Mann in 1996 when he asked her husband, Michael Penn, to write the score and songs for his film, Hard Eight. Mann had songs on soundtracks before but never "utilized in such an integral way", she said in an interview. She gave Anderson rough mixes of songs and found that they both wrote about the same kinds of characters. He encouraged her to write songs for the film by sending her a copy of the script. Anderson said that "Simon and Garfunkel is to The Graduate as Aimee Mann is to Magnolia".

Two songs were written expressly for the film: "You Do", which was based on a character later cut from the film, and "Save Me", which closes the film; the latter was nominated in the 2000 Academy Awards and Golden Globes and in the 2001 Grammys. Most of the remaining seven Mann songs were demos and works in progress; "Wise Up", which is at the center of a sequence in which all of the characters sing the song, was originally written for the 1996 film Jerry Maguire. At the time, Mann's record label had refused to release her songs on an album. The song that plays at the opening of the film is Mann's cover of "One" by Harry Nilsson. Mann's track "Momentum" is used as the loud playing music in Claudia's apartment scene when Officer Jim arrives and was also featured in the trailer for the film.

The soundtrack album, released in December 1999 on Reprise Records, features the Mann songs, as well as a section of Jon Brion's score and tracks by Supertramp and Gabrielle that were used in the film. Reprise released a full score album in March 2000.

Reception

Box office
Magnolia initially opened in a limited release on December 17, 1999, in seven theaters grossing $193,604. The film was given a wide release on January 7, 2000, in 1,034 theaters grossing $5.7 million on its opening weekend. It eventually grossed $22.5 million in North America and $26 million in other territories, for a worldwide tally of $48.5 million, against its budget of $37 million.

Critical response 

On Rotten Tomatoes, the film holds an approval rating of 83% based on 147 reviews, with an average rating of 7.50/10. The site's critical consensus reads, "Magnolia is an ambitious, lengthy work that ultimately succeeds due to interesting stories and excellent ensemble performances." On Metacritic, the film has a weighted average score of 77 out of 100, based on 34 critics, indicating "generally favorable reviews". Audiences polled by CinemaScore gave the film an average grade of "C−" on an A+ to F scale.

USA Today gave the film three and a half stars out of four and called it "the most imperfect of the year's best movies". Roger Ebert from the Chicago Sun-Times awarded the film four stars out of four, praising it in both of his reviews from 2000 and 2008, and as his second favorite film of 1999, behind Being John Malkovich. He said in the first review, "Magnolia is the kind of film I instinctively respond to. Leave logic at the door. Do not expect subdued taste and restraint, but instead a kind of operatic ecstasy". After rewatching it in 2008, he added the film to his 'Great Movies' list. Entertainment Weekly gave the film a "B+" rating, praising Cruise's performance: "It's with Cruise as Frank T.J. Mackey, a slick televangelist of penis power, that the filmmaker scores his biggest success, as the actor exorcises the uptight fastidiousness of Eyes Wide Shut ... Like John Travolta in Pulp Fiction, this cautiously packaged movie star is liberated by risky business". The Independent said that the film was "limitless. And yet some things do feel incomplete, brushed-upon, tangential. Magnolia does not have the last word on anything. But is superb". Kenneth Turan, in his review for the Los Angeles Times, praised Tom Cruise's performance: "Mackey gives Cruise the chance to cut loose by doing amusing riffs on his charismatic superstar image. It's great fun, expertly written and performed, and all the more enjoyable because the self-parody element is unexpected". In his review for The New York Observer, Andrew Sarris wrote, "In the case of Magnolia, I think Mr. Anderson has taken us to the water's edge without plunging in. I admire his ambition and his very eloquent camera movements, but if I may garble something Lenin once said one last time, 'You can't make an omelet without breaking some eggs'."

In her review for The New York Times, Janet Maslin wrote, "But when that group sing-along arrives, Magnolia begins to self-destruct spectacularly. It's astonishing to see a film begin this brilliantly only to torpedo itself in its final hour," but went on to say that the film "was saved from its worst, most reductive ideas by the intimacy of the performances and the deeply felt distress signals given off by the cast". Philip French, in his review for The Observer, wrote, "But is the joyless universe he (Anderson) presents any more convincing than the Pollyanna optimism of traditional sitcoms? These lives are somehow too stunted and pathetic to achieve the level of tragedy". The Time critic Richard Schickel wrote: "The result is a hard-striving, convoluted movie, which never quite becomes the smoothly reciprocating engine Anderson (who did Boogie Nights) would like it to be."

In an interview, Ingmar Bergman mentioned Magnolia as an example of the "strength of American cinema". Roger Ebert included the work in his "Great Movies" list in November 2008, saying, "As an act of filmmaking, it draws us in and doesn't let go." Total Film magazine placed it at number 4 in their list of 50 Best Movies in Total Film's lifetime. In 2008, it was named the 89th greatest movie of all time by Empire magazine in its issue of The 500 Greatest Movies of All Time. It received eight votes – five from critics and three from directors – in the British Film Institute's 2012 Sight & Sound polls.

Following the film's release, Anderson said: "I really feel ... That Magnolia is, for better or worse, the best movie I'll ever make." Later, however, he came to consider it overlong; when asked in a Reddit AMA what he would tell himself to do if he could go back to when he shot the movie, his response was "Chill The Fuck Out and Cut Twenty Minutes."

Accolades

In 2004, the American Film Institute nominated the song "Save Me" from this film for AFI's 100 Years ... 100 Songs.

Themes
Essays have been written on the themes in Magnolia, such as regret; loneliness; the cost of failed relationships as a result of parents, particularly fathers, who have failed their children; and cruelty to children and its lasting effect (as demonstrated by the sexual assault perpetrated on Claudia by Jimmy).

Raining frogs and Exodus (Bible) references

At the end of the film, frogs rain from the sky. Throughout the film, there are references to the Book of Exodus 8:2 "And if thou refuse to let them go, behold, I will smite all thy borders with frogs."

The film has an underlying theme of unexplained events, taken from the 1920s and 1930s works of Charles Fort. Fortean author Loren Coleman's 2001 book "Mysterious America: The Revised Edition" includes a chapter entitled "The Teleporting Animals and Magnolia", addressing the film. The chapter discusses how one of Fort's books is visible on the table in the library and the film's end credit thanking Charles Fort.

The only character who seems to be unsurprised by the falling frogs is Stanley. He calmly observes the event, saying, "This happens. This is something that happens." This has led to the speculation that Stanley is a prophet, allegorically akin to Moses, and that the "slavery" to which the film alludes is the exploitation of children by adults. These "father issues" persist throughout the film, as seen in the abuse and neglect of Claudia, Frank, Donnie, Stanley, and Dixon.

Home media
The DVD release includes a lengthy behind-the-scenes documentary, That Moment. It uses a fly-on-the-wall approach to cover nearly every aspect of production, from production management and scheduling to music direction to special effects. The behind-the-scenes documentary is an in-depth look into Anderson's motivation and directing style. Pre-production included a screening of the film Network (1976), as well as Ordinary People (1980). Several scenes showed Anderson at odds with the child actors and labor laws that restrict their work time. The character of Dixon has further scenes filmed but, from Anderson's reactions, appear not to be working. These scenes were cut completely and have never been shown on DVD.

Notes

References

External links

 
 
 
 
The Best and Worst of Magnolia’s Multiple Melodramas from The A.V. Club

1999 films
1999 drama films
Aimee Mann
American drama films
Best Foreign Film Guldbagge Award winners
1990s French-language films
1990s German-language films
Films about cancer
Films about death
Films about depression
Films about dysfunctional families
Films about narcissism
Films directed by Paul Thomas Anderson
Films featuring a Best Supporting Actor Golden Globe winning performance
Films scored by Jon Brion
Films set in Los Angeles
Films set in the San Fernando Valley
Films shot in Los Angeles
Films with screenplays by Paul Thomas Anderson
Golden Bear winners
Hyperlink films
Incest in film
New Line Cinema films
2000s English-language films
1990s English-language films
1990s American films
2000s American films